Hugh Crosbie Heggie  (born 1950) is an Australian public servant and physician who is the 23rd and current administrator of the Northern Territory since 2 February 2023.

Career
Heggie was born in Melbourne, Victoria in 1950, and educated at Bonbeach High School. He attended the University of Melbourne and graduated with a Bachelor of Medicine and Bachelor of Surgery. On the completion of his first degree he relocated to Sydney where he worked as a research pharmacologist before returning to Melbourne. In 2001, after 20 years in Melbourne, he relocated to the Northern Territory with his family.

Between 2016 and 2022, Heggie served as the Chief Health Officer and executive director of Public Health and Clinical Excellence in the Northern Territory. He played a significant role during the COVID-19 pandemic in Australia and served on numerous boards, committees and councils locally and nationally.

On 29 November 2023, the Chief Minister Natasha Fyles announced Heggie would become the 23rd Administrator of the Northern Territory, succeeding Vicki O'Halloran. He was sworn in by Governor-General David Hurley on 2 February 2023.

Honours
Heggie was awarded the Public Service Medal (PSM) in the 2021 Australia Day Honours for "outstanding public service to community health in the Northern Territory". He was also awarded the Humanitarian Overseas Service Medal in 2021 for his contributions during the 2015 Cyclone Pam disaster in Vanuatu.

References

1950 births
Living people
Australian medical doctors
Australian health officials
21st-century Australian public servants
Administrators of the Northern Territory
Recipients of the Public Service Medal (Australia)
People from Melbourne
Melbourne Medical School alumni